Saint Monon (or Mono, Muno, Monone; died ) was a Scottish hermit and martyr.
His feast day is 18 October.

Life and legacy

Saint Monon was born in Scotland and moved to the Ardennes, where he lived as a hermit.
He was murdered around 645 AD in Nassogne in what is now Belgium.
His body, which had been beheaded, was placed in an oratory.
Pilgrims began to visit his shrine, and it was said that many miracles occurred.
He is honoured in the Ardennes as a protector of livestock, and is traditionally shown standing with a cow.
Pilgrims to his shrine used to rub grass or leaves on the reliquary of Saint Monon, then give it to their cattle to protect them from epidemics.
They would also hang a flower or a bouquet in their stable.

The Chapelle Saint-Monon in Hubermont, La Roche-en-Ardenne, is a small schist building built around 1658, renovated in 1817 and restored in 1982.
A neogothic church built in 1850 in Jévigné, Lierneux, is dedicated to the saint, and has a polychrome wood statue of him.
His name is given to a local beer brewed in the village of Ambly, Nassogne, named Saint-Monon.

Monks of Ramsgate account

The monks of St Augustine's Abbey, Ramsgate wrote in their Book of Saints (1921),

Butler's account

The hagiographer Alban Butler (1710–1773) wrote in his Lives of the Fathers, Martyrs, and Other Principal Saints under October 18,

Notes

Sources

 

 

Medieval Scottish saints
645 deaths